is a Japanese manga series written by Mitsuhiro Mizuno and illustrated by . It was first serialized in Shogakukan's shōnen manga magazine Weekly Shōnen Sunday from November 2010 to June 2012, and later in Shōnen Sunday S from June 2012 to October 2013, with its chapters collected in six tankōbon volumes. A sequel, Shin Chiisai Hito: Aoba Jidō Sōdanjo Monogatari, started in Shōnen Sunday S in July 2016.

Publication
It was later serialized in Shōnen Sunday S from June 25, 2012, to October 25, 2013. Shogakukan collected its chapters in six tankōbon volumes, released from November 18, 2011, to November 18, 2013.

A sequel, titled , started in Shōnen Sunday S on July 25, 2016. Shogakukan released the first tankōbon on December 17, 2016. As of June 17, 2022, eleven volumes have been released.

Volume list

Chiisai Hito

Shin Chiisai Hito

Reception
Chiisai Hito was one of the fifty manga titles selected for a manga exhibition about the promotion of human rights, held by the Tokyo Metropolitan Human Rights Promotion Center in 2015. In September 2015, the manga began its electronically distribution on Manga Kingdom and Comic Shogakukan Books, and the number of downloads exceeded 370,000 in about a month, the highest number of electronically distributed works by Shogakukan; part of the sales were donated to the Orange Ribbon Campaign, as part of the Ministry of Health, Labour and Welfare's "Child Abuse Prevention Promotion Month". According to Manga Zenkan, Chiisai Hito was the 17th best-selling manga in 2015.

References

Further reading

Books about child abuse
Drama anime and manga
Shogakukan manga
Shōnen manga